Lamco International Insurance Limited (Lamco) is an insurance company based in Port Louis, Mauritius.  It provides insurance products and services from eleven sub-offices and several accredited agencies throughout the island of Mauritius.

History
The company was incorporated in 1978.

Offices

References

1978 establishments in Mauritius
Insurance companies of Mauritius
Financial services companies established in 1978
Companies based in Port Louis